Giulio Zignoli (19 April 1946 – 12 September 2010) was an Italian professional footballer, who played as a defender. He made 108 appearances in Serie A, most notably for Cagliari and Milan, during the late 1960s and 1970s. He died in Cantù, aged 64.

Honours

Club 
Cagliari
Serie A: 1969–70
A.C. Milan
Coppa Italia: 1971–72, 1972–73
Cup Winners' Cup: 1972–73

References

External links 
 Profile at MagliaRossonera.it 
 Profile at EmozioneCalcio.it 

1946 births
2010 deaths
Italian footballers
Serie A players
Serie B players
Association football defenders
Taranto F.C. 1927 players
S.S.C. Bari players
Cagliari Calcio players
A.C. Milan players
S.S.D. Varese Calcio players
U.S. 1913 Seregno Calcio players